Sven Meyer (born 4 September 1970) is a German former professional footballer who played as a defender or midfielder.

Career
Meyer played as a youth for various clubs in West Berlin, ending up at Hertha BSC, where he progressed to the reserve team. He was part of the young Hertha reserve team that reached the 1992–93 DFB-Pokal final – the only reserve team to have done this – before losing 1–0 against Bayer 04 Leverkusen. Like many of that squad, he was given a chance in Hertha's first team, and made 70 appearances in the 2. Bundesliga.

In 1996, he moved across town, joining 1. FC Union Berlin, where he made 40 league appearances in the Regionalliga Nord, captaining a young side. In January 1998, he moved to China, one of the first German footballers to do so, signing for Chengdu Wuniu. Six months later he was back in Germany, joining SV Babelsberg of Potsdam. He later had spells with FC Bremerhaven and VfB Oldenburg before returning to Berlin in 2002, joining Tennis Borussia. He spent two years there, and five with Spandauer SV, and is still active in the Berlin-Liga, playing for Berliner Sport-Club. He also plays for Hertha's veterans' team.

Meyer played in a variety of defensive or midfield roles, and was commonly deployed as a sweeper.

References

External links 
 
 Sven Meyer at immerunioner.de 

1970 births
Living people
Footballers from Berlin
German footballers
Association football defenders
Association football midfielders
2. Bundesliga players
Hertha BSC II players
Hertha BSC players
1. FC Union Berlin players
Chengdu Tiancheng F.C. players
SV Babelsberg 03 players
FC Bremerhaven players
VfB Oldenburg players
Tennis Borussia Berlin players
German expatriate footballers
German expatriate sportspeople in China
Expatriate footballers in China
West German footballers